Werner Danz (3 June 1923 – 18 March 1999) was a German politician of the Free Democratic Party (FDP) and former member of the German Bundestag.

Life 
Danz was a member of the Bad Kreuznach city council from 1960 to 1969. In the 1961 federal elections he entered the German Bundestag via the Rhineland-Palatinate state list, of which he was a member until 1965.

From 1967 to 1983 he was a member of the Rhineland-Palatinate state parliament, where he was deputy chairman from 1967 to 1969 and then chairman of the FDP parliamentary group until 1982. In 1982/83 he was again vice-chairman of the parliamentary group. At the same time, he served as Vice-President of the state parliament. From 1979 to 1989, Danz was a member of the Bad Kreuznach district council.

Literature

References

1923 births
1999 deaths
Members of the Bundestag for Rhineland-Palatinate
Members of the Bundestag 1961–1965
Members of the Bundestag for the Free Democratic Party (Germany)
Members of the Landtag of Rhineland-Palatinate